White Noise is the second album by the American noise rock group Cop Shoot Cop, released in 1991 by Big Cat. The band supported the album with a North American tour.

Critical reception

The Chicago Tribune wrote that "with two bass guitars, drums and a variety of taped sound effects, Cop Shoot Cop courts dissonance—'white noise'—without actually succumbing to it. Rather, 'white noise' might actually refer to the band itself, modern purveyors of the white-boy blues."

Track listing

Personnel
Adapted from the White Noise liner notes.

Cop Shoot Cop
Tod Ashley – lead vocals, high-end bass guitar, guitar
Jim Coleman – sampler, tape
Jack Natz – low-end bass guitar, lead vocals (4)
Phil Puleo – drums, percussion

Production and additional personnel
Martin Bisi – production, recording, mixing (1-4, 7, 9, 11)
Hugh Foley – spoken word (7)
Killjoy – voice (6)
Dave Sardy – mixing (9)
Subvert Entertainment – cover art, design
J. G. Thirlwell – mixing (5, 6, 8, 10, 12)

Release history

References

External links 
 

Cop Shoot Cop albums
1991 albums
Big Cat Records albums
Albums produced by Martin Bisi